Jan Hamáček (born 4 November 1978) is a Czech politician who was leader of the Czech Social Democratic Party (ČSSD) from February 2018 until October 2021, and minister of the Interior from June 2018 to December 2021. He also served as the speaker of the Chamber of Deputies from 2013 to 2017, and was acting minister of Foreign Affairs from June to October 2018 and from 12 to 21 April 2021. Hamáček was a member of the Chamber of Deputies from 2006 to 2021.

Political career
Prior to his election to parliament, Hamáček worked as an adviser to two prime ministers, and as his party's International Secretary.

Hamáček was first elected to the Chamber of Deputies in the 2006 elections. During his time in parliament, he has held the position of Vice-Chairman of the Committee on Foreign Affairs, headed the Czech delegation to the NATO Parliamentary Assembly and served on the Committee on European Affairs.

Hamáček became the leader of ČSSD in March 2018. In Andrej Babis' Second Cabinet, sworn in during June 2018, he was named Minister of the Interior, and also served as acting Minister of Foreign Affairs from June to October 2018. Miroslav Poche was originally nominated to be the minister, but due to President Miloš Zeman's refusal to swear him in, Hamáček was made acting foreign minister until the situation could be resolved. On 16 October 2018, Tomáš Petříček was named the new Minister of Foreign Affairs.

In August 2018, Hamáček helped negotiate the release of two workers from a German humanitarian group in Syria, and traveled to Damascus for the handover of the workers; the Czech Republic is the only country in Europe that maintains diplomatic relations with Syria.

In 2021,  reported that Hamáček was considering negotiating with Russia not to disclose evidence of Russia's involvement in the 2014 Vrbětice ammunition warehouses explosions in exchange for 1 million doses of Sputnik V vaccine. Hamáček denied the accusation and said that he intended to sue the media outlet. The journalist, said that he had an audio recording.

After ČSSD's poor performance in the 2021 Czech legislative election, in which the party failed to meet the 5% voting threshold, Hamáček resigned as leader of the party.

Other activities 
He is a Senior Network Member at the European Leadership Network (ELN).

References

1978 births
Czech Social Democratic Party MPs
Living people
Speakers of the Chamber of Deputies (Czech Republic)
Charles University alumni
People from Mladá Boleslav
Leaders of the Czech Social Democratic Party
Czech Social Democratic Party Government ministers
Interior ministers of the Czech Republic
Members of the Chamber of Deputies of the Czech Republic (2006–2010)
Members of the Chamber of Deputies of the Czech Republic (2010–2013)
Members of the Chamber of Deputies of the Czech Republic (2013–2017)
Members of the Chamber of Deputies of the Czech Republic (2017–2021)